Bareli may refer to:

 Bareilly, a city in Uttar Pradesh, India
 Bareli, Raisen, a town in Madhya Pradesh, India 
 Bareli or Eastern Bhil, a sub-group of Bhil languages
 Pauri Bareli language
 Rathwi Bareli language

See also
 Bareilly (disambiguation)